bless4 is a Japanese vocal ensemble from the United States consisting of four siblings from the Kawamitsu family. Youngest sister Akino has her own solo musical career, and youngest brother Aiki has also released a solo single (with eldest brother Akashi arranging) to accompany his book.

History
All but Akashi were born within the United States, as their father Haru brought his family to Utah to further his education at Brigham Young University shortly after Akashi was born.  They moved to Arizona and there both Akashi and Kanasa were Arizona State Taekwondo Champions (at ages 14 and 12, respectively), while the whole family was part of a taekwondo exhibition troupe called the "Flying Dragons" with other taekwondo practitioners.

Haru brought his family back to Okinawa in 1997 after feeling a spiritual longing for his heritage as an Okinawan.

They made their debut in May 2003 from BMG Japan with the song "Good Morning! Mr. Sunshine"

All four now reside in Kawasaki, Kanagawa Prefecture, and remain followers of the Church of Jesus Christ of Latter-day Saints.

They made their own independent company in December 2006 with AKASHI as the President of Kawamitsu Arttainment.

In February 2010, the youngest, AIKI made his debut as an author of a non-fiction novel, based on his own experiences of losing a friend to drugs, titled "Heart Prints ~inochi no hana~".  (From Bungeisha)

In March 2011, their company became a limited company and opened their own record label: KAWAMITSU RECORDS.

May 2010, they held their first Korean tour performing at 3 different places in Korea, including Seoul, which proved to be a success.

In September, the group released the single "Dandelion" in Europe on the German record label Marabu Records. The song placed #1 on the Radio Berlin International Charts.

They released their newest album "Yumetsumugi" (Dream Weaving) on January 12, 2011, 6 years after their debut album.  It is a self-produced album with each member working as staff to bring their music video and album to life.

On April 19 2022, Aiki announced his departure from the band in order to concentrate his life on his family and his current endeavours.

Members
Current members
 - Born  in Okinawa Prefecture
 - Born  in Utah
 - Born  in Utah
Former members
 - Born  in Utah

Discography

Singles
"Good Morning! Mr. Sunshine" - 
 - 
 -  (Okinawa Prefecture),  (Japan)
 - 
 - 
/ -  (Digital Release)
"Dandelion" - 
"Sunshine Dancer" -

Akino

Aiki
 -  (Okinawa Prefecture)
 -  (From publishing company Bungeisha)

Albums
 - As "Kawamitsu Family"
ALL 4 ONE - 
 - 
WE ARE WARRIORS -

References

External links
bless4 website 
bless4 at Watanabe Music Publishing
bless4 at Sony Music Entertainment
bless4 at Marabu Records

Japanese pop music groups
Musical groups from Okinawa Prefecture
Musical groups from Phoenix, Arizona
Musical groups from Utah
Japanese Latter Day Saints
Musical groups established in 2003
2003 establishments in Arizona